Kalsilite (KAlSiO4) is a vitreous white to grey feldspathoidal mineral that is found in some potassium-rich lavas, such as from Chamengo Crater in Uganda. It has a relative hardness of 5.5.

References 

 Webmineral.com
 Handbook of Mineralogy

Potassium minerals
Aluminium minerals
Feldspathoid
Hexagonal minerals
Minerals in space group 182